Ranid herpesvirus 2 is a species of virus in the genus Batrachovirus, family Alloherpesviridae, and order Herpesvirales.

References

External links 
 

Alloherpesviridae